Green Glacier is a glacier on the east side of Graham Land, Antarctica,  long and  wide, flowing from the plateau northeast between Dugerjav Peak and Rugate Ridge, and then east into Vaughan Inlet next north of Pirne Peak and south of the terminus of Hektoria Glacier.

It was surveyed by the Falkland Islands Dependencies Survey (FIDS) in 1955, and was named by the UK Antarctic Place-Names Committee for John R. Green, FIDS leader at Deception Island in 1950 and at the Argentine Islands in 1951.

References

Glaciers of Oscar II Coast